Rafik Bacha (born 4 December 1989) is a Tunisian handball player for Club Africain and the Tunisian national team.

He represented Tunisia at the 2019 World Men's Handball Championship.

References

1989 births
Living people
Tunisian male handball players
Mediterranean Games medalists in handball
Mediterranean Games silver medalists for Tunisia
Competitors at the 2018 Mediterranean Games